Annetto Depasquale (28 July 1938 – 29 November 2011) was the Roman Catholic titular bishop of Aradi and the auxiliary bishop of the Roman Catholic Archdiocese of Malta, Malta.

Biography 

Depasquale was born in Qormi on 28 June 1938, and was ordained a priest on 7 April 1962.
 
He served in the Commission for Children's Homes and the Pastoral Research Services as well as the parish of St George in Qormi and later the parish of English-speaking Catholics. He was appointed Chancellor of the Curia in 1977 and Pastoral Secretary in April 1986.
 
He became Vicar General, deputy to Archbishop Joseph Mercieca, on 16 November 1989. His episcopal consecration took place on 2 January 1999. Once viewed as a possible successor to Mercieca, Depasquale suffered serious ill health which kept him away from his duties for several months. Although he eventually returned to duty, he never fully recovered.

Depasquale died on 29 November 2011.

Notes

21st-century Roman Catholic bishops in Malta
21st-century Roman Catholic titular bishops
1938 births
2011 deaths
Place of death missing
People from Qormi
Maltese Roman Catholic bishops